"Dreaming My Dreams with You" is a song written by Allen Reynolds, and recorded by Waylon Jennings' for his 1975 album, Dreaming My Dreams. Jennings' version was also released as a single that year.

The song has been covered by many artists including Bria Salmena, Emmylou Harris and Rodney Crowell, Cowboy Jack Clement, Cowboy Junkies, Alison Krauss, Jamey Johnson, Crystal Gayle, Patty Loveless, Martina McBride, Mark Chesnutt, John Prine and Kathy Mattea, Marianne Faithfull, Jewel,and Charles Esten.

Charts

Colleen Hewett version
In 1979, Australian recording artist Colleen Hewett released a version which peaked at number 2 in Australia and was certified gold.

Charts

Weekly charts

Year-end charts

References

1975 songs
1979 singles
Waylon Jennings songs
Colleen Hewett songs
Songs written by Allen Reynolds